Kotido is a town in the Northern Region of Uganda. It is the chief municipal, administrative, and commercial center of the Kotido District and the site of the district headquarters.

Location
The coordinates of the town are 3°00'21.6"N, 34°06'45.0"E (Latitude:3.0060; Longitude:34.1125).

Population
The 2002 national census estimated the population of the town of Kotido at 12,900. The Uganda Bureau of Statistics (UBOS) estimated the population at 21,500 in 2010. In 2011, UBOS estimated the mid-year population at 22,900.

Points of interest
The following additional points of interest lie within the town limits or close to the edges of towne:
 offices of Kotido Town Council
 Kotido central market
 Kotido Airport, a civilian airport administered by the Civil Aviation Authority of Uganda
 confluence of three major roads in the center of Kotido:
 Kaabong-Kotido road
 Kotido-Moroto road
 Kotido-Pader-Palwo road
 headquarters of the Roman Catholic Diocese of Kotido.

Mars crater
On October 24, 2017 a crater on Mars was named after the town.

See also
Karimojong
List of cities and towns in Uganda

References

External links
 Japan-funded Water Project Launched in Kotido Town Council

Populated places in Northern Region, Uganda
Kotido District
Karamoja